Mohammed Shakir may refer to:

 Mohammed Shakir (Indian politician) (born 1948)
 Mohammed Shakir (Iraqi politician) (born 1941)
 Muhammad Habib Shakir (1866–1939), Egyptian judge
 Mohammed Shakir (footballer), Iraqi goalkeeper (born 1996)